Big Run is an unincorporated community in Wetzel County, West Virginia, United States. It is named for Big Run, on which it is located.

References

Unincorporated communities in West Virginia
Unincorporated communities in Wetzel County, West Virginia